The 1943 CCCF Championship was held in San Salvador, El Salvador from 5 to 19 December 1943. The tournament was the second edition of the CCCF Championship which was the championship tournament of the Football Confederation of Central America and the Caribbean (CCCF), the governing body of association football in Central America and the nations in the Caribbean prior to 1961, when it was replaced by CONCACAF.

Participating teams

Venues 

The host of the tournament was El Salvador and all matches were played at the Estadio Nacional Flor Blanca in San Salvador.

Final standings

Matches

Goalscorers

References

External links 
 CCCF Championship on RSSSF Archive

CCCF Championship
CCCF Championship
International association football competitions hosted by El Salvador
CCCF
1943 in Central American sport
1943 in El Salvador
December 1943 sports events
20th century in San Salvador
Sports competitions in San Salvador